Düpenau is a river of Hamburg and Schleswig-Holstein, Germany. In Osdorf, Hamburg it flows through Lake Helmuth Schack. It is a tributary of the Mühlenau near Pinneberg.

See also
List of rivers of Hamburg
List of rivers of Schleswig-Holstein

Rivers of Hamburg
Rivers of Schleswig-Holstein
Rivers of Germany